The inhabitants of Lviv, Ukraine are commonly known in English as Leopolitans (from the Neo-Latin name for the city, Leopolis). The following is a list of notable Leopolitans.

See also
 People from L'viv (Category:)

References 

History of Lviv
Lists of Ukrainian people
Lists of Polish people
Lviv
Lviv